The 2016 Copa Petrobrás de Marcas season will be the sixth season of the Brasileiro de Marcas. It will begin at Velopark, Nova Santa Rita in April, and will end at Interlagos in December. In 2016 Brasileiro de Marcas will be integrated at Stock Car Brasil events, with only the last round at Interlagos being held as a stand-alone event.

Teams and drivers

Race calendar and results
All races were held in Brazil.

References

External links
  

Marcas
Brasileiro de Marcas seasons